Gamelan, although Indonesia is its origin place, is found outside of that country.  There are forms of gamelan that have developed outside Indonesia, such as American gamelan and Malay Gamelan in Malaysia.

Australia and New Zealand
See also New Zealand gamelan
Most of the gamelans in Australia are associated with universities or schools. One of the most famous is the gamelan Digul, made in the Digul prison camp in 1927 and brought to Australia during World War II.  In cities such as Melbourne, local gamelan groups take the opportunity to play in public to encourage interest both in gamelan music and in Indonesian culture.

In New Zealand there are two gamelan sets in Wellington, one Javanese and the other Balinese. There are gamelan ensembles in Auckland, Christchurch and Dunedin.

Catalonia

Since July 2013 there is a complete gamelan gong kebyar set in the Museu de la Música de Barcelona. From an opening workshop given by professor Andrew Channing, the ensemble has had a stable formation called Gamelan Penempaan Guntur (Gamelan Forge of Thunders). The group offers regular concerts at the museum and other venues, including international festivals.

Malaysia 
See main article.

Mexico
The first gamelan in Mexico is that owned by the Indonesian Embassy in Mexico City since the 1990s. It is a bronce Javanese slendro gamelan, but it started to be used and became active since young Mexican music students were convened by Fitra Ismu Kusumo, an Indonesian student in Mexico, and began using and playing this gamelan in 2002 and founded the group Indra Swara. Currently in Mexico there are at least four sets of gamelan: a Surakartan style steel slendro pelog gamelan, and a Javanese slendro bronce gamelan, both owned by the Embassy of Indonesia in Mexico City; and gamelan Asep Mangsa(gamelan humo del tiempo), a Javanese pelog gamelan, and gamelan Barudak, a Sundanese degung gamelan, both owned by Indra Swara.

The Netherlands
The first gamelans outside of Indonesia were in the Netherlands, the country which had colonized the islands. Before World War II, the Javanese dancer Jodjana had a small gamelan group in the Netherlands, which accompanied his performances. He had to train Dutch musicians. Early during the war, the resistance fighter Bernardus IJzerdraat was killed by the Germans. His son Bernard then left home and in Amsterdam heard a group of stranded Javanese sailors play a gamelan at the Colonial Museum (later: Museum of the Tropics). He took lessons with them and soon started his own group with friends from his school in Haarlem. In this he received help from Jaap Kunst who taught him to transcribe the then existing 78 rpm recordings and who allowed him to use the beautiful antique Yogyanese gamelan set in the museum. This became Babar Layar, the first serious gamelan group in the Netherlands. Babar Layar played in Yogyakarta style, after Bernard studied one full year in the kraton. They often accompanied Mas Pakun, a Yogyanese dancer who studied theology in Amsterdam. When Mantle Hood came to Amsterdam to write his dissertation on pathet, Bernard trained him to play gamelan. (Mas Pakun died a few years later in a tragic traffic accident after his return to Indonesia.) Mantle Hood later taught ethnomusicology in the U.S., and is regarded as the founding father of gamelan in that country. Bernard married a Sundanese wife and emigrated to Indonesia in 1954, where he became known as Suryabrata, working for RRI Jakarta and Universitas Nasional.

Jaap Kunst advocated the idea of polymusicality, that is the idea that every human being can learn to understand any kind of music. So one could learn to appreciate not only western music but also Javanese gamelan, North-Indian sitar and tabla ensembles, the Japanese biwa etcetera. When asked (around 1955?) if there was any music that he could not understand, he played a record with a recording of Mexican Indians playing and singing in such a disorderly way that it was impossible to hear any structure.

In 1971, the ethnomusicologist Ernst Heins invited K.R.M.T. Ronosuripto of the Mangkunagaran palace, Surakarta to Amsterdam. This gave a new impetus to the performance of gamelan and Javanese dance in the Netherlands. Together with Mr and Mrs Ronosuripto, the Amsterdam Gamelan group played many concerts and performances with Javanese dance and shadow puppetry (wayang kulit). Rien Baartmans, who as a child had been taking lessons from Bernard IJzerdraat, studied wayang and kendhang with Pak Ripto, which very much stimulated his own group Ngesthi Raras in Haarlem.

In 1978 the new gamelan society Naga, founded by Rob van Albada, acquired a gamelan from Solo. This gamelan was used by several groups, performing traditional and modern music for gamelan. In the same year Elsje Plantema (a musician specializing in Javanese gamelan) and Rien Baartmans (dhalang) founded Raras Budaya, with the aim of performing wayang kulit in Dutch. Between 1980 and 1992, Raras Budaya performed numerous wayang plays. When Naga was dissolved in 1995, their gamelan was given to Raras Budaya, and is still used by gamelan groups conducted by Elsje Plantema.
After Rien Baartmans died in 1993, Elsje Plantema changed focus. Without dhalang, her new ensemble Widosari concentrated on traditional and modern gamelan music, and projects with dancers, Javanese dhalangs (Sri Djoko Raharjo, Joko Susilo and others), composers like I Wayan Sadra, Al. Suwardi and Sinta Wullur, and the combination of gamelan and western instruments.
Nowadays, several Javanese and Balinese gamelan groups are active in the Netherlands. Javanese style groups exist in Amsterdam, Indonesian Embassy The Hague 1975 ISTIKA (Ikatan Seni Tari Indonesia di Nederland) Trainer FX Suhardi Djojoprasetyo, Renkum and Arnhem. Balinese groups can be found in Amsterdam and The Hague. A Sundanese group exists in Leiden (Leyde).
The gamelan emsemble in Delft (Museum Nusantara) has stopped playing (April 2014) because the museum was forced to close its doors after the state subsidy ended.
1975 ISTIKA ( Ikatan Seni Tari Indonesia di Nederland ) plays Javanese Traditional Karawitan dan Dance.

Poland
The Polish band - Warsaw Gamelan Group - is perhaps the only band in this part of Europe that plays Indonesian music. WGG specialises in music from central Java.

Portugal
There are two Javanese gamelans in Portugal, one in Lisbon, at Fundação do Oriente and another in Oporto at Casa da Música. Besides being used for traditional Javanese music, the gamelan at Casa da Musica has been at the centre of very innovative projects, including the development of a Robotic Gamelan. 
Inspired by the ideas of gamelan collective practice, Companhia de Música Teatral developed the "Gamelão de Porcelana e Cristal" with  hundreds of porcelain and crystal-ware pieces in Opus Tutti, an artistic and educational project that aims to improve community musical practices for infancy.

United States and Canada
See also List of gamelan ensembles in the United States and American Gamelan

There are more than 100 gamelans in the United States. Gamelan music was introduced to the Western hemisphere at the World's Columbian Exposition of 1893 in Chicago. A Sundanese gamelan was imported as part of the Java Village exhibit and was acquired by the Field Museum of Natural History following the exposition. After the gamelan was restored in the late 1970s, it was used for instruction by a community arts organization, which gave its first performance in May 1978. The organization incorporated in 1980 as Friends of the Gamelan and continues to perform with two central Javanese gamelan sets that it has acquired.

Many schools, universities and other institutions in North America own sets of gamelan instruments. These gamelans are typically played by mixed-gender groups of students, a practice that is rare in Indonesia for religious reasons. Among the earliest such groups were Wesleyan University and UCLA. Established institutional gamelan ensembles in the U.S. include Gamelan Nyai Saraswati at University of North Carolina at Chapel Hill, Gamelan Burat Wangi and Gamelan Kyai Dorodasih at California Institute of the Arts, Gamelan Galak Tika at Massachusetts Institute of Technology, Gamelan Lila Muni at Eastman School of Music, Gamelan Semara Santi at Swarthmore College, Sekaa Gong Hanuman Agung at Florida State University, Gamelan Saraswati at University of Maryland, College Park, Gamelan Kembang Atangi at Loyola Marymount University, Gamelan Giri Kusuma at Pomona College, and the Javanese Court Gamelan, “Son of the Good Earth,” at Creighton University. A Gamelan is also owned by the University of North Texas called Bwana Kumala (Light of the World).  The Acadia University School of Music in Nova Scotia, Canada, has access to a Gamelan Degung.  Students can take an Intro to Gamelan course, or audition for the Gamelan Ensemble.

There are also professional gamelan ensembles.  Gamelan Son of Lion is a group that focuses on newly composed music by both the composer-members of the group and invited composers from around the world. Gamelan Kori Mas performs Balinese music on bamboo instruments in the San Francisco bay area. Gamelan X is based in Oakland.

Since 1979, a few gamelan ensembles have been organized as community arts organizations or clubs. The first Javanese community group was the Boston Village Gamelan, now known as Gamelan Laras Tentrem  in Massachusetts, and the first Balinese community group was Gamelan Sekar Jaya in California. Other community Balinese gamelan ensembles are Gamelan Mitra Kusuma in Washington, D.C., Gamelan Dharma Swara at the Indonesian Consulate in New York City, Space City Gamelan in Houston, the Lehigh Valley Gamelan in Bethlehem, Pennsylvania, and Gamelan Tunas Mekar  in Denver. Gamelan Sari Raras is an active Javanese ensemble in Berkeley, California; the name was given to the group by Widiyanto (aka Midiyanto), and the instruments, brought to the U.S. from Java in 1971, are named Kyai Udan Mas, or Venerable Golden Rain. The Indonesian Embassy in Washington, DC hosts another Javanese gamelan, as well as offering classes in Balinese gamelan and various styles of Indonesian dance.

Canadian composer Claude Vivier wrote several works for Balinese and Javanese gamelan after visiting the region in 1977 and 1978, including Aikea and Cinq chansons pour percussion (1980). Canada's oldest gamelan is the Toronto-based Evergreen Club Contemporary Gamelan (with Sundanese degung instruments), founded in 1983. Another early gamelan ensemble is Kyai Madu Sari (Venerable Essence of Honey), donated by the Indonesian Government after the 1986 Expo in Vancouver, which resides since then at the School for the Contemporary Arts at Simon Fraser University.  A gamelan gadhon, Alligator Joy, was commissioned from Pak Tentrem of Solo, Central Java and brought to Vancouver in 1990 and resides at the Western Front Artist Center. Both Vancouver-based ensembles are regularly used in performances by the Vancouver Community Gamelan.

United Kingdom
There are over eighty gamelans (as of 2002) of various kinds in the United Kingdom, many of them based at colleges or community centres. University of York was the first British university to purchase a gamelan, named Kyai Sekar Patak; it is still played by students there. The oldest community Gamelan group in the UK is the Oxford Gamelan Society, which plays Kyai Madu Laras, donated to the University of Oxford's Bate Collection of Musical Instruments by the Indonesian ministry of Forestry in 1985. Other active groups exist at SOAS, Dartington College of Arts, Queen's University Belfast, the University of Aberdeen, the University of Durham, Kingston University and City University, London, amongst others. A program of classes has relaunched at Southbank Centre, which also has a performing group of gamelan professionals, the Southbank Gamelan Players. The Glasgow-based Gamelan Naga Mas  regularly gives performances and introductory workshops, teacher and special needs (Gamalanability) courses in Scotland. The London Symphony Orchestra holds a Balinese gamelan at LSO St Luke's; this is used by schools, a community group, players of the orchestra and Balinese composers.

Ireland
There are several gamelans in the Republic of Ireland, both institutionally and privately owned.

The first gamelan in Ireland was acquired by the music department of University College Cork. The gamelan was custom made for UCC by gong-smith Pak Tentrem Sarwanto in Java and arrived in Ireland in 1995. The UCC Javanese gamelan was given the name Nyai Sekar Madu Sari (Venerable Flower of Honey Essence) in a traditional naming ceremony.

Galway also boasts a gamelan. It is owned by Soundscape, a Brothers of Charity group. The gamelan is used both for in a music therapy and community outreach capacity and also by an amateur musicians group called Gamelan na Gaillimhe. The official opening ceremony of the gamelan, where it was welcomed to the city of Galway by both the local musicians group and members of London group Siswa Sukra, was held in the Town Hall Theatre on 1 October 2011.

The first regular gamelan orchestra in Ireland's capital city of Dublin was established in University College Dublin in October 2012, directed by Dr. Peter Moran. This is a Solonese set of instruments, originally owned privately by Niamh Tiernan.

In April 2013, the National Concert Hall announced that Peter Moran was to establish a second gamelan orchestra in Dublin, with newly built instruments presented as a gift from Sultan  Hamengkubuwono X of Yogyakarta, to be housed permanently in the National Concert Hall.  As of 2018, there were four different ensembles regularly rehearsing and performing on these instruments.

Russia
Gamelan Dadali is the first (and so far the only one) Javanese gamelan group in Moscow, Russia. It was established under the patronage of the Indonesian Embassy in Moscow in 2017. The name of the group was inspired by the Javanese word Dadali which means garuda. Garuda is the symbol of the Indonesian state. The name Gamelan Dadali reflects an Indonesian cultural symbol in Moscow.

The group has more than 50 songs in its repertoire including classic and modern compositions. Gamelan Dadali team also performs musical accompaniment to the Wayang Kulit shadow theater and classical Indonesian dance. The group performs during cultural festivals, it accompanies yoga events, as well as exhibitions and presentations.

In December 2021, the group presented the first-ever wayang performance in the Russian language with a Russian-speaking puppeteer.

See also

 Gamelan
 Music of Indonesia

References

External links

List of gamelan ensembles in the United States

Gamelan